Gajil is an ancient and historical district in Tabriz. The district is mainly famous for having one of the major gates of the older Tabriz in ancient times. In Pahlavi period, Golestan Park, is constructed in part of the Gajil district, which was previously used as a cemetery.

Sources
Gajil

See also 
Golestan Park

Districts of Tabriz